The 2006–07 First Division season was the twelfth season of the Scottish First Division in its current format of ten teams. It began on August 5, 2006 and ended on April 28, 2007.

Gretna gained promotion to the Premier League as champions, by a single point ahead of St Johnstone, with a 3-2 win at Ross County on the final day of the season, the winning goal coming from James Grady in injury time. The result relegated Gretna's opponents to the Second Division.

Airdrie United entered a playoff with the second, third and fourth placed teams from the Second Division - Stirling Albion, Raith Rovers and Brechin City, respectively.

Promotion and Relegation from 2005–06

SPL & First Division
Relegated from Premier League to First Division
 Livingston

Promoted from First Division to Premier League
 St Mirren

First & Second Divisions
Relegated from First Division to Second Division
 Stranraer
 Brechin City (via play-offs)

Promoted from Second Division to First Division
 Gretna
 Partick Thistle (via play-offs)

League table

Top scorers

Attendances
The average attendances for First Division clubs for season 2006/07 are shown below:

First Division play-offs

Semi-finals
The ninth placed team in the First Division played the fourth placed team in the Second Division and third placed team in the Second Division played the second placed team in the Second Division. The play-offs were played over two legs, the winning team in each semi-final advanced to the final.

First legs

Second legs

Final
The two semi-final winners played each other over two legs. The winning team was awarded a place in the 2007–08 First Division.

First leg

Second leg

Stirling Albion were promoted to the First Division

Awards

SPFA Team of the Year

Goalkeeper
Alan Main (Gretna)

Defenders
Martin Canning (Gretna)
Neil McGregor (Clyde)
Kevin James (St Johnstone)
Goran Stanic (St Johnstone)

Midfielders
Craig Bryson (Clyde)
Alex Rae (Dundee)
Don Cowie (Ross County)

Forwards
Jason Scotland (St Johnstone)
Colin McMenamin (Gretna)
Mark Roberts (Partick Thistle)

SPFA Player of the Year

Winner
Colin McMenamin (Gretna)

Other nominees:

Mark Roberts (Partick Thistle)
Jason Scotland (St Johnstone)
Goran Stanic (St Johnstone)

Notes

Scottish First Division seasons
1
2
Scot